"Satellite of Love" is a song by Lou Reed. It is the second single from his 1972 album Transformer. At the time of its release, it achieved minor US chart success (No. 119), though it later became a staple of his concerts and compilation albums.

Background and recording
"Satellite of Love" was composed in 1970 while Reed was still a member of the Velvet Underground. Fellow member Doug Yule, in a 2005 interview, recalled Reed's first mentioning the song to him in the summer of 1970 while they were riding in the back of a limousine with Steve Sesnick: "Steve was there going on about "how we needed airplay", and Lou said "I have this song 'Satellite of Love', and he mentioned the satellite that had just gone up which was a big deal in the news at the time, cause the space race was happening, and Steve Sesnick said 'Yeah, yeah – that'll do it!'" While the band had soon recorded a demo track in the summer of 1970 during the sessions for Loaded, it did not make the final album.

The song is about a man who observes a satellite launch on television, and contemplates what Reed describes as feelings of "the worst kind of jealousy" about his unfaithful girlfriend. The chorus is:
I watched it for a little while
I love to watch things on TV
Satellite of love
Satellite of love

David Bowie, who produced the album with Mick Ronson, provided background vocals, especially for the final chorus. Reed wrote later: "He has a melodic sense that's just well above anyone else in rock & roll. Most people could not sing some of his melodies. He can really go for a high note. Take 'Satellite of Love', on my Transformer album. There's a part at the very end where his voice goes all the way up. It's fabulous."

The existence of the original Velvet Underground version was unknown until the release of the box set Peel Slowly and See in 1995. It also appears on the 1997 Rhino Records 2-CD version of the Loaded album.

In addition to being more up-tempo, the band's version contains a significant change in the lyrics. The lines:
I've been told that you've been bold
With Harry, Mark, and John
Monday, Tuesday, Wednesday to Thursday
With Harry, Mark, and John

were originally recorded as:
I've been told baby you've been bold
With Winkin, Blinkin, and Nod
Monday, Tuesday, Wednesday to Thursday
To Winkin, Blinkin, and Nod

Reflecting on the original lyrics, Reed said, "Jesus. Best left forgotten. Obviously, I didn't want to use real names yet. I probably wanted to make sure I wasn't using a name that really meant something to me."

Personnel

Lou Reed – guitar, lead vocals
David Bowie and the Thunderthighs – backing vocals
Trevor Bolder – trumpet
Herbie Flowers – tuba
Mick Ronson – piano, recorder
Klaus Voormann – bass
John Halsey – drums

Reception
The song topped the Far Out top ten list of Lou Reed's songs.  Cash Box called it "another strange effort that should attract a varied crowd of record buyers" and "stands a great commercial shot at scoring many chart points."

Charts
"Satellite of Love '04"

Morrissey version

Morrissey's live cover of the song was digitally released on 2 December 2013 as a tribute to Reed, following his death in 2013. The song was recorded on 25 November 2011 in at the Chelsea Ballroom of Cosmopolitan of Las Vegas in Nevada. The 7" and 12" vinyl version and a three-track digital version were also released on January 28, 2014. All three versions of the single were supported by additional live tracks, including a rendition of the Smiths' song "Vicar in a Tutu", a cover of Buzzcocks' song "You Say You Don't Love Me" and his 1992 song "You're Gonna Need Someone on Your Side". The cover topped the U.S. Billboard Hot Singles Sales chart.

Track listing
12"	

A-side
 "Satellite of Love" (Live)
 "You're Gonna Need Someone on Your Side"

B-side
 "Vicar in a Tutu" (Live)
 "All You Need Is Me" (Live)

7"

A-side
 "Satellite of Love" (Live)

B-side
 "You're Gonna Need Someone on Your Side"
 "You Say You Don't Love Me" (Live) (Buzzcocks cover)

Digital download
 "Satellite of Love" (Live)
 "You're Gonna Need Someone on Your Side"
 "Mama Lay Softly on the Riverbed" (Live)

Credits and personnel
 Morrissey – lead vocals
 Boz Boorer – guitar, mixing
 Jesse Tobias – guitar
 Gustavo Manzur – piano, backing vocals
 Solomon Walker – bass
 Matt Walker – drums
 David Millward – recording, production
 Scott Minshall – design
 Bill Inglot – mastering
 Dan Hersch – mastering
 Renaud Monfourny – photography
 Mick Ronson – production ("You're Gonna Need Someone on Your Side")

Charts

Other cover versions
U2 performed the song for the 1992 Zoo TV Tour featuring Lou Reed via a giant screen. Tyler Golsen of the Far Out Magazine listed the live performance as one of "seven of the best Lou Reed covers of all time."

In popular culture 
 The Satellite of Love spaceship is the primary setting of the TV comedy series Mystery Science Theater 3000. The song, with lyrics reflecting the characters ("Gypsy, Tom, and Crow" instead of "Harry, Mark, and John", for example), was sung at the end of all live shows featuring the cast.
 The song is mentioned in the Def Leppard song "Rocket".
 The Ron & Fez Show closed every show with the song. Sometimes the show's cast and producers will sing along.
 In Adventureland, Mike Connell's (Ryan Reynolds) claims that he was formerly a musician with Lou Reed are proven false when he periodically demonstrates ignorance of Reed's music, including referring to "Satellite of Love" as "Shed a Light on Love".
 The song was used in the fourth season of the TV series Gilmore Girls. In the episode "Raincoats and Recipes," the song plays as Rory Gilmore (Alexis Bledel) loses her virginity to her married ex-boyfriend Dean (Jared Padalecki).
 The Lou Reed version of the song is played in the 1998 movie Velvet Goldmine, with Ewan McGregor lip-syncing the backing vocals.

References

1973 singles
Lou Reed songs
Songs written by Lou Reed
The Velvet Underground songs
U2 songs
Song recordings produced by David Bowie
1972 songs
2013 singles
Morrissey songs
Parlophone singles
RCA Records singles
Milla Jovovich songs